The Durga Vahini (ISO: Durgā Vāhinī ) (Army of Durga) is the women's wing of the Vishva Hindu Parishad (VHP). It was established in 1991 and its founding chairperson is Sadhvi Rithambara. The Vishva Hindu Parishad states the purpose of the Durga Vahini is to empower women, encourage more women to participate in spiritual and cultural activities. Kalpana Vyash, a senior leader of the organization, said that the Durga Vahini members dedicate themselves "to physical, mental and intellectual development". The aim of the organization is to establish Hindu solidarity by helping Hindu families during the time of hardship and by providing social services. According to Vyash, the total membership of the group is 8,000 as of 2002, and 1,000 members are from Ahmedabad.

Activities and ideology

The Durga Vahini is often considered to be the female face of the Bajrang Dal The organization is wrongly described as a militant outfit, right-wing religious fundamentalist group.

The Durga Vahini actively recruits young women from low-income earning families. Members learn karate and lathi, and receive ideological education. The organization especially recruits young girls for carrying tasks in which much physical strength is required, for example confronting Muslim people committing blasphemy  and to fight on the front lines in places like Ayodhya.

In the Bijnor riot in 1990, activists belonging to the Durga Vahini allegedly organized a procession of Hindu men through the Muslim quarters of Bijor shouting provocative slogans which started violence.

On 16 March 2002, Durga Vahini activists wielding tridents and sporting saffron headbands arrived at the Orissa Assembly along with VHP and Bajrang Dal members.

The Durga Vahini was alleged to have participated in the 2002 Gujarat violence. Durga Vahini has denied such allegations. Regarding the Durga Vahini's role in the riots, VHP spokesman Kaushikbahi Mehta said, "We in the VHP had nothing to do with the violence except to take care of widows and victims of the Godhra mayhem. So was the case with the Durga Vahini". But many people claimed that white-churidar clad girls were involved in the violence. A senior police official said, "They were found providing healing touch to the male activists, information back-up and if the ethnic cleansing theory is true, I have a feeling they played a significant role in intelligence network as well. While it will be very difficult to prove their direct involvement, women Sanghis had definitely scrutinised voters’ list or the traders’ licence papers to screen the minorities with an innocuous intention".

Six members of the Durga Vahini were arrested in Gwalior in March 2004 for blackening the face of Neetu Sapra, director of the play Kal Aaj Aur Kal. The Vishva Hindu Parishad and the Bajrang Dal claimed the play depicted Rama, Sita, Laxman and Hanuman in "indecent" way. The activists also damaged the furnitures in Sapra's home.

In July 2017, Durga Vahini organized a training camp for self-defence in Jammu & Kashmir, girls from 17 border towns of the state participated in the camp.

See also
 The World Before Her, a documentary partly chronicling the training at a Durga Vahini camp
 Rashtra Sevika Samiti

References

External links
 Durga Vahini , Vishva Hindu Parishad website

Sangh Parivar
Religiously motivated violence in India
Women's organisations based in India
Hindu organizations
Vishva Hindu Parishad
Military wings of political parties